Ze with diaeresis (Ӟ ӟ; italics: Ӟ ӟ) is a letter of the Cyrillic script. It is used only in the Udmurt language, where it represents the voiced alveolo-palatal affricate . It is usually romanized as ⟨đ⟩ but its ISO 9 transliteration is ⟨z̈⟩

Computing codes

See also
З з : Cyrillic letter Ze
Ҙ ҙ : Cyrillic letter Dhe or Ze with descender
З̌ з̌ : Cyrillic letter Ze with caron
Ђ ђ : Cyrillic letter Dje
Z̈ z̈ : Latin letter Z with diaeresis
Cyrillic characters in Unicode

References
 

Cyrillic letters with diacritics
Letters with diaeresis